Leiomyza scatophagina  is a species of fly in the family Asteiidae. It is found in the  Palearctic .

References

External links
Images representing Leiomyza scatophagina  at BOLD

Asteiidae
Insects described in 1823
Muscomorph flies of Europe